Peter Maurice may refer to:
Peter Maurice (priest) (1803–1878), Welsh priest and writer
Peter Maurice (bishop) (born 1951), Bishop of Taunton
Peter Maurice (Dean of Bangor) (died 1759)
Peter Maurice Music, a UK based music publishing company established in 1930

See also
Peter Morris (disambiguation)